Ottomans culture evolved over several centuries as the ruling administration of the Turks absorbed, adapted and modified the various native cultures of conquered lands and their peoples. There was influence from the customs and languages of Islamic societies, while Persian culture had a significant contribution through the Seljuq Turks, the Ottomans' predecessors. Despite newer added amalgamations, the Ottoman dynasty, like their predecessors in the Sultanate of Rum and the Seljuk Empire were influenced by Persian culture, language, habits and customs. Throughout its history, the Ottoman Empire had substantial subject populations of Orthodox subjects, Armenians, Jews and Assyrians, who were allowed a certain amount of autonomy under the millet system of Ottoman government, and whose distinctive cultures were adopted and adapted by the Ottoman state.

As the Ottoman Empire expanded it assimilated the culture of numerous regions under its rule and beyond, being particularly influenced by Turkic, Greco-Roman, Islamic, and Persian culture.

Literature

Poetry 

As with many Ottoman Turkish art forms, the poetry produced for the Ottoman court circle had a strong influence from classical Persian traditions; a large number of Persian loanwords entered the literary language, and Persian metres and forms (such as those of Ghazal) were used.

By the 19th century and the era of Tanzimat reforms, the influence of Turkish folk literature, until then largely oral, began to appear in Turkish poetry, and there was increasing influence from the literature of Europe; there was a corresponding decline in classical court poetry. Tevfik Fikret, born in 1867, is often considered the founder of modern Turkish poetry. Recaizade Mahmud Ekrem, an Ottoman writer and intellectual had also started his early career by writing poems in the newspaper of İbrahim Şinasi, Tasvir-i Efkar. Later in his career he helped a literary movement in the Empire - Servet-i Fünun, to emerge. Recaizade Mahmud Ekrem, had published poems like, Ah Nijad!, Şevki Yok and Güzelim.

Folk Literature 
According to Mehmet Fuat Köprülü, the Ottoman - Turkish folk literature has three spheres in terms of their topics. First, is the themes that comes from old Turkic tradition. Second, the religious topics that has been originated from Islamic tradition. Lastly, the topics that comes from the Persian tradition which are not religious but mostly artificial subjects.

Poet-musicians (ozan), were travelling around the Central Asia since the 9th century by telling epics, stories, and performing religious acts with their kopuz. This tradition lived in Anatolia in the time of the Seljuk and the Ottoman Empire  but with an Islamic intervention. Name aşık was adopted starting from the 14th and 15th centuries, it was an equivalent of the name ozan. Aşıks were the poets with an instrument called bağlama (saz), they were travelling around Anatolia and telling epics from old Turkic tradition with Islamic influence.

Prose 

Prior to the 19th century, Ottoman prose was exclusively non-fictional, and was much less highly developed than Ottoman poetry, in part because much of it followed the rules of the originally Arabic tradition of rhymed prose (Saj'). Nevertheless, a number of genres - the travelogue, the political treatise and biography - were current.

From the 19th century, the increasing influence of the European novel, and particularly that of the French novel, began to be felt. Şemsettin Sami's Taaşuk-u Tal'at ve Fitnat, widely considered the first Turkish novel, was published in 1872; other notable Ottoman writers of prose were Ahmet Mithat and Halit Ziya Uşaklıgil.

Architecture 

Ottoman architecture was a synthesis of Seljuk architectural traditions, as seen in the building of Konya and Mamluk architecture. It was also influenced by the Byzantine architecture; it reached its greatest development in the large public buildings, such as mosques and caravanserais, of the 16th century.

The most significant figure in the field, the 16th-century architect and engineer Mimar Sinan, was a Muslim convert, having a background in the Janissaries. His most famous works were the Selimiye Mosque in Edirne and the Suleiman Mosque in Constantinople. One of his pupils, Sedefkar Mehmed Agha, designed the early 17th century Blue Mosque, considered the last great building of classical Ottoman architecture.

Decorative arts

Calligraphy 

Calligraphy had a prestigious status under the Ottomans, its traditions having been shaped by the work of Abbasid calligrapher Yaqut al-Musta'simi of Baghdad, whose influence had spread across the Islamic world, al-Musta'simi himself possibly being of Anatolian origin.

The Diwani script is a cursive and distinctively Ottoman style of Arabic calligraphy developed in the 16th and early 17th centuries. It was invented by Housam Roumi, reaching its greatest development under Süleyman I the Magnificent (1520–66). The highly decorative script was distinguished by its complexity of line and by the close juxtaposition of the letters within words. Other forms included the flowing, rounded Nashki script, invented by the tenth-century Abbasid calligrapher Ali Muhammad ibn Muqlah, and Ta'liq, based on the Persian Nastalīq style.

Noted Ottoman calligraphers include Seyyid Kasim Gubari, Şeyh Hamdullah, Ahmed Karahisari, and Hâfiz Osman.

Miniatures 

The Ottoman tradition of painting miniatures, to illustrate manuscripts or used in dedicated albums, was heavily influenced by the Persian art form, though it also included elements of the Byzantine tradition of illumination and painting. A Greek academy of painters, the Nakkashane-i-Rum was established in the Topkapi Palace in the 15th century, while early in the following century a similar Persian academy, the Nakkashane-i-Irani, was added.

We can establish approximatively the reign of Mehmed II (1451–81) as a moment of `birth´ of the production of the Ottoman miniatures with the first pieces having been found coming from this era. During that era many manuscripts show a desire in the court to establish a painting studio in the recently annexed capital of the empire Istanbul. This project seems to have succeeded in the 1480s, while we have clear proof of its existence and of the opening of new studios in other cities around 1825.

Carpet-weaving and textile arts 

The art of carpet weaving was particularly significant in the Ottoman Empire, carpets having an immense importance both as decorative furnishings, rich in religious and other symbolism, and as a practical consideration, as it was customary to remove one's shoes in living quarters. The weaving of such carpets originated in the nomadic cultures of central Asia (carpets being an easily transportable form of furnishing), and was eventually spread to the settled societies of Anatolia. Turks used carpets, rugs and patterned kilims not just on the floors of a room, but also as a hanging on walls and doorways, where they provided additional insulation. They were also commonly donated to mosques, which often amassed large collections of them.

Hereke carpets were of particularly high status, being made of silk or a combination of silk and cotton, and intricately knotted. Other significant designs included "Palace", "Yörük", Ushak, and Milas or "Türkmen" carpets. "Yörük" and "Türkmen" represented more stylized designs, whereas naturalistic designs were prevalent in "Palace".

Jewelry 
The Ottoman Empire was noted for the quality of its gold- and silversmiths, and particularly for the jewelry they produced. Jewelry had particular importance as it was commonly given at weddings, as a gift that could be used as a form of savings. Silver was the most common material used, with gold reserved for more high-status pieces; designs often displayed complex filigree work and incorporated Persian and Byzantine motifs. Developments in design reflected the tastes of the Ottoman court, with Persian Safavid art, for example, becoming an influence after the Ottoman defeat of Ismail I after the Battle of Chaldiran in 1514. In the rural areas of the Empire, jewelry was simpler and often incorporated gold coins (the Ottoman altin), but the designs of Constantinople nevertheless spread throughout Ottoman territory and were reflected even in the metalwork of Egypt and North Africa.
 
Most jewelers and goldsmiths were Christian Armenians and Jews, but the interest of the Ottomans in the related art of watchmaking resulted in many European goldsmiths, watchmakers and gem engravers moving to Constantinople, where they worked in the foreigners' quarter, Galata.

Performance

Music 

Apart from the music traditions of its constituent peoples, the Ottoman Empire evolved a distinct style of court music, Ottoman classical music. This was a principally vocal form, with instrumental accompaniment, built on makamlar, a set of melodic systems, with a corresponding set of rhythmic patterns called usul.

Another distinctive feature of Ottoman music were the mehterân,  the military bands used by the Janissaries and in the retinues of high-ranking officials. These bands were the ancestors of modern military bands, as well as of the brass ensembles popular in traditional Balkan music.

Clothing 
Clothing of the Ottoman Empire was not something out of taste, it stated religion, ethnicity, and class in the pre-nineteenth century Ottoman Empire. At the time it was easy to visually see the status of people in the Ottoman Empire. For instance the Fez was a garment that showed modernity in the 1820s of The Ottoman Empire, but a decade later was seen as a backward garment of the Turkish Republic.

Dance 
Dancing was an important element of Ottoman culture, which incorporated the folkloric dancing traditions of many different countries and lands on three continents; from the Balkan peninsula and the Black Sea regions to the Caucasus, the Middle East and North Africa.

Dancing was also one of the most popular pastimes in the Harem of Topkapı Palace.

The female belly dancers, named Çengi, were mostly from the Roma community. Today, living in Istanbul's Roma neighbourhoods like Sulukule, Kuştepe, Cennet and Kasımpaşa, they still dominate the traditional belly dancing and musical entertainment shows throughout the city's traditional taverns.

There were also male dancers, named Köçek, who took part in the entertainment shows and celebrations, accompanied by circus acrobats, named Cambaz, performing difficult tricks, and other shows which attracted curiosity.

Meddah (one person show) 

The meddah or story teller played in front of a small group of viewers, such as a coffeehouse audience. The play was generally about a single topic, the meddah playing different characters, and was usually introduced by drawing attention to the moral contained in the story. The meddah would use props such as an umbrella, a handkerchief, or different headwear, to signal a change of character, and was skilled at manipulating his voice and imitating different dialects. There was no time limitation on the shows; a good meddah had the skill to adjust the story depending on interaction with the audience.

Meddahs were generally traveling artists whose route took them from one large city to another, such along the towns of the spice road; the tradition supposedly goes back to Homer's time. The methods of meddahs were the same as the methods of the itinerant storytellers who related Greek epics such as the Iliad and Odyssey, even though the main stories were now Ferhat ile Şirin or Layla and Majnun. The repertoires of the meddahs also included true stories, modified depending on the audience, artist and political situation.

The Istanbul meddahs were known to integrate musical instruments into their stories: this was a main difference between them and the East Anatolian Dengbejin.

In 2008 the art of the meddahs was relisted in the Representative List of the Intangible Cultural Heritage of Humanity.

Karagöz (shadow play) 

The Turkish shadow theatre, also known as Karagöz ("Black-Eyed") after one of its main characters, is descended from the Oriental Shadow theatre. Today, scholars generally consider the technique of a single puppeteer creating voices for a dialogue, narrating a story, and possibly even singing, all while manipulating puppets, to be an Indonesian invention. According to Georg Jacob the certain date of Karagöz and Hacivat shadow play is unknown. However, the shadow play itself was invented in China and then transferred into Turkish tradition with the contribution of Mongols. The other theory is that the tradition of shadow play was introduced to Ottoman Empire from Egypt. And it is known that Egypt got this tradition from the Island of Java with the interaction through Arab merchants starting from 7th to 10th centuries.

Parts and the Characters of Karagöz 
Karagöz shadow play (gölge oyunu) consists of four parts. 1. Giriş (Introduction), 2. Muhavere (Conversation), 3. Fasıl, 4. Bitiş (Ending).

In the Introduction part, Hacivat enters the stage with the sound of Nareke - a tool that sounds like a buzzing of a bee, and starts reading poems which is an invitation for Karagöz to come to the stage.

In terms of characters, Karagöz and Hacivat was a reflection of Ottoman society. The cosmopolite structure of the Empire - especially of Istanbul, was shown to the audience. Here is the list of some characters of the shadow play:

Main Characters: Karagöz and Hacivat

Women: Zenne

Characters from Istanbul: Çelebi, Tiryaki, Beberuhi and Matiz

Provincial Characters: Laz, Kürd, Kayserili, Kastamonulu, Eğinli

Muslim Characters outside of Anatolia: Muhacir (Turkish Balkan immigrant), Arab, Fars, Arnavut (Albanian)

Non-Muslim Characters: Rum (Greek), Frank (European), Ermeni (Armenian), Yahudi (Jew)

Bullies and Drunks: Efe, Zeybek, Matiz, Külhanbeyi, Sarhoş (Drunk)

Characters who has mental or physical setbacks: Hımhım, the Stutterer, the Madman, the Cannabis addict, Denyo

Entertainers: Male Köçek Dancer, Female Çengi Dancer, Singer, Magician, Acrobat, Musician, Illusionist, Reveller

Supernatural Characters: Wizard, Cadılar (Witches), Djins and Demons,

and with other understudies games were played.

Orta Oyunu or Medyan (Median) (open stage show) 
The first mention of the name Orta Oyunu takes its place in 1834 in the wedding ceremony inscription (Surname) of Saliha Sultan in those lines of poetry:

“Cümle etraf-nişin-i meydan oldu / Oldu orta oyunundan handan.” 

Medyan (Median) or Orta Oyunu (the name “Orta Oyunu” was first used in the end of the 18th century.), is an open stage theatric play that consists of two main characters “Kavuklu” and “Pişekar”. The play is based on discourse, two main characters of Orta Oyunu tell jokes from one to another to create an environment of humour. Just like in Karagöz and Hacivat play. However, Medyan's way of playing is more flexible compared to Karagöz and Hacivat.

Medyan took its final form with the starting of the 19th century. It is known that in Seljuk Turks plays that are based on performing imitation and personification were common. However, with the combination of raks (dance), musiki (music), muhavere (discourse), and histrionics the play of Ortaoyunu took its final shape. Other influential plays such as Karagöz and Hacivat, Kukla (puppet play), dans (dance), meddah (encomiastics) and prestidigitation were also significant in the shaping of Medyan, it is because those plays were also based on personification.

The forming elements of Orta Oyunu are the musics, different forms of dances, wizardries of the different countries that is in the Ottoman Empire. Alongside with these, their cultural way of mocking, mimicking and discourses are also have a great amount of place in the play of Orta Oyunu.

Stage and Characters 
The play was played in an open area with people gathered around the field. Orta oyunu is also unique since it does not have any plot. So, improvisation is very important. Musiki (music) is also very important since folk songs or poems are two of the key elements of the play. There are also supporting characters beside Kavuklu and Pişekar. Such as, Curcunabazlar, Çengiler (Women dancers) and Köçekler (Young men dancers who mimics the women dancers). Other characters were alikes of the Ottoman society who mimics the stereotypes of different Ottoman millets like, Arab, Armenian, Albanian, Kurdish, Laz, Jew. The name of area that the play was played was called “Meydan” (Square). Also there is another space that is called “Yeni Dünya” (New World), and in this place men and women audience follow the play. The section of the men audience is called “mevki” (position); while the section of the women called “kafes” (cage).

The last representative of orta oyunu was İsmail Dümbüllü who passed away in the year of 1973.

Sports

Tanzimat and Development of Sports 
Tanzimat Period was particularly important in terms of the development of sports and gymnastics in the Ottoman Empire. As other fields like education, the influence of France is the most visible one. It is known that in Mekteb-i Harbiye (Staff Officer Academy), activities of gymnastics were added on the curriculum in 1863 which makes it the first mandotary modern sports lesson of the Empire - Riyazat-ı Bedeniye.

Other schools like Mekteb-i Sultani (Galatasaray Lisesi - Galatasaray High School) and Robert College were the pioneers of the Ottoman Empire in gymnastics. Galatasaray High School was the school of Faik Üstünidman who will later be known as “Şeyhü’l-İdman” because of his leadership in educating gymnastics students. Selim Sırrı Tarcan was also one of the pioneers of sports of the Ottoman Empire, he was the first person who put forward the ideal of competing in the olympic games.

Sultan Abdülaziz after his visits to Europe, ordered the translation of gymnastics books which will be used as school books in the Ottoman Empire. In 1869 Rüştiyeler (Junior High Schools), in 1870 Mekteb-i Tıbbiye (Ottoman Medical School), in 1887 İdadiler (High Schools) were now having gymnastics and fencing classes in their syllabuses.

Sports Clubs in the Ottoman Empire

The Jewish Gymnastics Club of Constantinople, founded in 1895, was the first of Istanbul's sports clubs, soon followed by Kurtuluş Sports Club founded in 1896 by Ottoman Greeks. The opening of these athletic clubs symbolized a general growth in sports and sports culture in Istanbul at the time. In the coming years, Beşiktaş Gymnastics Club, the Galatasaray Sports Club, and the Fenerbahçe Sports Club — Istanbul's “big three” — were founded. Exercise, as well as football and gymnastics were commonplace among the primarily affluent members of these clubs. In contrast to the fairly exclusive “big three”, Vefa Sports Club, established after the progressive Young Turk revolution in 1908, served as an amateur sports and football club of the people.

	The turn of the twentieth century saw clubs spring up throughout Istanbul to appeal to many niches of young men, whether Muslim, Christian, or Jewish. Almost all athletic clubs were ethnically and religiously homogeneous, however they all shared a focus on physicality. Furthermore, the function of these institutions expanded beyond sports, as they taught young men proper hygiene, dress, and posture, in addition to serving as environments for male discourse and socializing.

	The development of athletic clubs enabled the rise of team sports in Istanbul — principally football — serving as contrasts to the more traditional Ottoman sports of oil wrestling and archery. For instance, upon its opening in 1905, Galatasaray functioned exclusively as a football club. This shift toward team competition represented a general modernization of sports in Istanbul, a modernization that can also be seen, for example, in the Beşiktaş Gymnastics Club as traditional Turkish wrestling embraced new mat technology.

	Athletic clubs revolutionized sports reporting in the Ottoman Empire, as publications began to cover club games. Futbol, written in Ottoman Turkish and initially released in 1910, served as Istanbul's first sports magazine, principally following club football matches.

Growth in sports related readership coincided with a growing sports spectating culture in Istanbul. 1905 saw the creation of the Constantinople Association Football League, which organized soccer matches among athletic clubs, while also providing entertainment for thousands of spectators. Completed in 1909, with the blessing of Sultan Abdülhamid II, the Union Club provided the first reliable stadium in which thousands of Istanbul spectators could gather to watch sports. Contrary to the strict homosocial exclusivity of many clubs, the Union Club allowed women to spectate athletic competitions. With this rise in spectatorship, Galatasaray and Fenerbahçe in particular, became recognized as the city's preeminent clubs. While heavily connected to football, the Union Club hosted a plethora events organized by a variety of Istanbul athletic clubs, including races, gymnastics, and more. For example, in 1911, the Union Club was the site of the first Armenian Olympics.

In the past century, many of these clubs have only continued to gain popularity. Now under the Republic of Turkey, the Süper Lig represents the region's most popular football league, and Galatasaray and Fenerbahçe are the league's most popular teams.

Ottoman cuisine 

The cuisine of Ottoman Turkey can be divided between that of the Ottoman court itself, which was a highly sophisticated and elaborate fusion of many of the culinary traditions found in the Empire, its predecessors (notably the Byzantine Empire), and the regional cuisines of the peasantry and of the Empire's minorities, which were influenced by the produce of their respective areas. Rice, for example, was a staple of high-status cookery (Imperial cooks were hired according to the skill they displayed in cooking it) but would have been regarded as a luxury item through most of Anatolia, where bread was the staple grain food.

Drinks 
 Turkish coffee - probably introduced from Levantine Arabic culture, coffee became central to Ottoman society - often accompanied with a Nargile (Narguile / Hookkah).
 Ayran - a traditional yogurt drink still popular throughout many areas of the former Empire.
 Sherbet - a spiced cold fruit drink.
 Rakı - a traditional Turkish alcoholic beverage.

Food 
 Lokum (Turkish delight)
 Şeker (Candies)
 Akide Şekeri
 Macun (Majoon)
 Pestil
 Sucuk
 Shish Kebab
 Çörek
 Baklava
 Lahmacun
 Döner
 Kebab

Science and technology 

The Ottoman era is often seen as an era of an alleged decline of science in the Muslim world, with an important persecution of `humanists´ scholars particularly starting in the XVIth century. This vision is often shared, even in academic circles.

On the contrary, interest in science and technology has shown a great spike during the XIXth century: observing the important technological advancement happening at the same time in Europe, Ottoman society sees a great transformation of its relation to science and research. One of the domain where this evolution is particularly visible is the domain of theology, where many authors start reconsidering the relation between Islam, Islamic values and Science.

We also see at the same period the Ottoman Empire becoming the host of multiple intellectual network led by prominent scientists of the region in very diverse domains. Networks that managed to expand throughout the muslim world while also integrating and discussing Western theories and ideas.

Timeline 
 October 22, 1784 - Imperial Naval Engineering school.
 Military Academy founded 1834
 Imperial School of Music founded 1836
 April 1, 1847 - Institution of the Ministry of Education founded
 July 18, 1851 - Inauguration of the Academy of Sciences
 Civil Service School founded 1859
 Imperial Ottoman Lycée of Galatasaray founded 1868

Gallery

References

External links 

 Hatvesanat.com Source on Islamic Calligraphy Art (mainly )
 Osmanlimedeniyeti.com Many articles about the Ottoman history and culture including art, culture, literature, economics, architecture 
 KalemGuzeli.net Traditional arts in Ottoman Empire (mainly )